Miss Polski 2020 was the 31st Miss Polski pageant, held on January 17, 2021. The winner was Anna Maria Jaromin of Silesia. Jaromin was originally supposed to represent Poland in Miss Supranational 2021 but withdrew due to the Miss Polski Organization having other plans for Jaromin at other international contests, mainly Miss International 2022. The 1st Runner-up, Natalia Balicka of Upper Poland, replaced her and represented the country at Miss Supranational. This years pageant was originally slated for December 2020 but was post-poned to January 2021 due to the COVID-19 pandemic.

Final results

Special Awards

Jury
The jury (judging panel) consisted of:
Ewa Wachowicz - Miss Polonia 1992 & World Miss University 1993
Viola Piekut
Ania Wyszkoni
Joanna Liszkowska
Elżbieta Sawerska - Miss Polski 2004
Katarzyna Krzeszowska - Miss Polski 2012
Olga Buława - Miss Polski 2018
Magdalena Kasiborska - Miss Polski 2019

Finalists

Notes

Withdrawals
 Lubusz - Sandra Krenc
 Opole
 Pomerania
 Subcarpathia
 Polish Community in the U.K. - Sabrinę Olkowicz

Returns
Last competed in 2016:
 Lubusz

Last competed in 2017:
 Upper Poland

Last competed in 2018:
 Kuyavia-Pomerania
 Lublin

Did not compete
 Holy Cross
 Polish Community in Argentina
 Polish Community in Australia
 Polish Community in Belarus
 Polish Community in Brazil
 Polish Community in Canada
 Polish Community in Czechia
 Polish Community in France
 Polish Community in Germany
 Polish Community in Ireland
 Polish Community in Israel
 Polish Community in Kazakhstan
 Polish Community in Lithuania
 Polish Community in Russia
 Polish Community in Slovakia
 Polish Community in South Africa
 Polish Community in Sweden
 Polish Community in Ukraine
 Polish Community in the U.S.
 Polish Community in Venezuela

References

External links
Official Website

2020
2021 beauty pageants
2021 in Poland
Events postponed due to the COVID-19 pandemic